Not for Publication is a 1927 American silent film directed by and starring Ralph Ince.

Cast
 Ralph Ince as 'Big Dick' Wellman  
 Roy Laidlaw as Commissioner Brownell  
 Rex Lease as Philip Hale  
 Jola Mendez as Beryl Wellman  
 Eugene Strong as Eli Barker

References

Bibliography
 Quinlan, David. The Illustrated Guide to Film Directors. Batsford, 1983.

External links

1927 films
Films directed by Ralph Ince
American silent feature films
1920s English-language films
American black-and-white films
Film Booking Offices of America films
1920s American films